This is a list of the first minority male lawyer(s) and judge(s) in Texas. It includes the year in which the men were admitted to practice law (in parentheses). Also included are other distinctions such as the first minority men in their state to graduate from law school or become a political figure.

Firsts in state history

Lawyers 

 William A. Price (1873) and Allen W. Wilder (1873) First African American male lawyers in Texas. Due to his mixed ancestry, Price was also the first Native American male lawyer in Texas.
John N. Johnson (1883): First African American male lawyer admitted to practice before the Supreme Court of Texas 
 Wellington Yee Chew (1951) and Jimmie F.Y. Lee (1957): First Chinese American male lawyers respectively in Texas

Judicial Officers

State

Judges 

 William A. Price (1873): First African American male judge in Texas. He may also be considered the first Native American male judge in Texas.
 Carlos Cadena (1940): First Hispanic American male to serve as a Chief Justice of a Texas court (1977)
 Jerry Birdwell: First openly LGBT male judge in Texas (1992)
 John Paul Barnich (1980): First openly LGBT male to become a city judge in Texas (1999)
 Jim Evans: First openly LGBT male to become a family court judge in Texas (2017)
 Nick Chu: First Asian American male to serve as a Justice of the Peace in Texas (2017)

County Court 

 Elisha Demerson: First African American male to serve as a county judge in Texas (1986)

District Court 

Steven Kirkland: First openly LGBT male district court judge in Texas (2008)
Ravi Sandill: First South Asian male district court judge in Texas (2009)

Appellate Court 

Henry E. Doyle: First African American male to serve as an appellate judge in Texas (1978)
Albert Armendariz, Sr. (1950): First Hispanic American male appointed as a Judge of the Texas Court of Appeals (1986)
Louis Sturns: First African American male appointed as a Judge of the Texas Court of Criminal Appeals (1990)
Morris Overstreet (1975): First African American male elected as a Judge of the Texas Court of Criminal Appeals (1991)
Fortunato "Pete" Benavides: First Latino American male to serve as Judge on the Texas Court of Criminal Appeals
Charles Spain: First openly LGBT male to serve as an appellate court judge in Texas (2018)

Supreme Court 

 Raul A. Gonzalez Jr. (1966): First Hispanic American male appointed as an Associate Justice of the Texas Supreme Court (1984)
David Wellington Chew: First Asian American male to serve as a Justice (1995) and Chief Justice of the Supreme Court of Texas (2006)
Wallace B. Jefferson: First African American male appointed as a Justice of the Texas Supreme Court (2001) and Chief Justice (2004)

Federal 

 Robert L. Pitman: First openly LGBT male to become a federal judge in Texas (2014)

District Court 

 Reynaldo Guerra Garza: First Hispanic American male appointed as a Judge of the U.S. District Court for the Southern District of Texas (1974)
Hipolito Frank Garcia (1951): First Hispanic American male appointed as a Judge of the U.S. District Court for the Western District of Texas (1979)
Sam A. Lindsay (1977): First African American male appointed as a Judge of the U.S. District Court for the Northern District of Texas (1998)
Jason K. Pulliam: First African American male appointed as a Judge of the U.S. District Court for the Western District of Texas (2019)

Attorney General 

 Dan Morales (c. 1981): First Mexican American male to serve as the Attorney General of Texas (1990)

Solicitor General 

 Ted Cruz (c. 1995): First Hispanic American male to serve as the Solicitor General of Texas (2003-2008)

United States Attorney 

 Robert L. Pitman: First openly LGBT male to serve as a U.S. Attorney in Texas (2011-2014)
 Nicholas Ganjei: First person of color to serve as the United States Attorney for the Eastern District of Texas (2021)

District Attorney 

 William A. Price (1873) and Craig Watkins (1994): First African American males elected respectively as a District Attorney in Texas (1876; 2006). Price was also the first Native American male to serve as a District Attorney in Texas.

Assistant District Attorney 

 Ollice Maloy, Jr.: First African American male to serve as an Assistant District Attorney in Texas (1959)

Political Office 

 Ted Cruz (c. 1995): First Hispanic American male to serve as the United States Senator from Texas (2013)

Bar Association 

 Richard Pena: First Hispanic American male (and first minority in general) to serve as the President of the State Bar of Texas (1998)
 Rehan Alimohammad: First Asian American male and immigration law attorney to serve as Chair of the Board for the State Bar of Texas

Firsts in local history 
Alphabetized by county name

Regions 

 Harold Valderas: First Latino American male to serve as a judge in North Texas (1971) and district court judge in Central Texas (1977)
Don B. Chae: First Asian American male lawyer (1980) and judge (1995) in North Texas
George W. Fremont (1879): First African American male lawyer in San Antonio, Texas [Bexar, Medina, and Comal Counties, Texas]
William Sim: First Asian American male to graduate from the University of Houston Bates College of Law
 Tony Bonilla: First Latino American male to graduate from the University of Houston Law Center (1960)
 Stephen Zamora: First Hispanic American male to serve as the Dean of the University of Houston Law Center (1995)
Armando V. Rodriguez: First Hispanic American judge in the municipal court of Houston, Texas and to be appointed as the Harris County Justice of the Peace by Commissioners Court [Harris, Fort Bend, and Montgomery Counties, Texas]
John Paul Barnich (1980): First openly LGBT male to become a city judge in Houston, Texas (1999) [Harris, Fort Bend, and Montgomery Counties, Texas]
John N. Johnson (1883): First African American male lawyer in Austin, Texas [Hays, Travis, and Williamson Counties, Texas]
Rogelio Fernandez Munoz (1974): First Latino American male to serve as the District Attorney for the 38th Judicial District [Medina, Real and Uvalde Counties, Texas]

Austin County 

 Richard Pena: First Hispanic American male (and first minority in general) to serve as the President of the Austin Bar Association, Texas (1990)
Joseph C. Parker Jr.: First African-American male to serve as the President of the Austin Bar Association, Texas (1996)
Ramey Ko: First Asian American male judge in Austin County and Travis County, Texas (2010)

Bastrop County 

 Orange Hicks: First African American male Justice of the Peace in Bastrop County, Texas (1888)
 Ronnie McDonald: First African American male judge in Bastrop County, Texas (1999)

Bexar County 

 John C. Alaniz (1957): First Hispanic American male (a lawyer) elected to the Texas State House of Representatives from Bexar County, Texas (1960)
Andrew L. Jefferson Jr. (1959): First African American male to serve as the Assistant District Attorney of Bexar County, Texas (1961)
Fred G. Rodriguez: First Hispanic American male to serve as the (Criminal) District Attorney of Bexar County, Texas (1987)
Tommy Calvert: First African American male to serve on the Commissioners Court for Bexar County, Texas (2014)

Caldwell County 

 M. Louis Cisneros: First Latino American male to serve as the Justice of the Peace in Caldwell County, Texas

Cameron County 

 Ray Ramon: First Latino American male judge in Cameron County, Texas (c. 1970s)
 Abel Toscano Jr. (1952): First Hispanic American male lawyer in Harlingen, Cameron County, Texas
Alfredo A. Garcia: First Hispanic American male to serve as a municipal court judge in San Benito, Cameron County, Texas

Dallas County 

 S.H. Scott (1881): First African American male lawyer in Dallas, Texas [Dallas County, Texas]
 George Washington Jr.: First African American male to serve as an Assistant District Attorney in Dallas County, Texas
 Felix Hilario Garcia: First Mexican (male) citizen to graduate from the Southern Methodist University (1931) [Dallas County, Texas]
 Louis A. Bedford Jr. (1951): First African American male judge in Dallas County, Texas (1966)
Frank P. Hernández: First Latino American male (who was of Mexican descent) judge in Dallas County, Texas (1977)
Thomas Jones: First African American male to serve as the Justice of the Peace for the Oak Cliff Precinct District, Texas (1990) [Dallas County, Texas]
Craig Watkins: First African American male District Attorney for Dallas County, Texas (2007)

Ector County 

 Richard Abalos (c. 1970s): First Hispanic American male lawyer in Odessa, Ector County, Texas

El Paso County 

 Frank Feuille, Jr: First male lawyer of French descent in El Paso, El Paso County, Texas
 Joe Calamia: First male lawyer of Italian descent in El Paso, Texas
 Frank Galvan: Reputed to be the first Mexican American male lawyer in El Paso, El Paso County, Texas
Albert Armendariz, Sr. (1950): First Hispanic American male to serve as a federal judge in El Paso, Texas (1976)
George Rodriguez: First Hispanic American to serve as the President of the El Paso Bar Association, Texas

Fort Bend County 

 William A. Price (1873): First African American male District Attorney for Fort Bend County, Texas (1876)
James DeAnda (1950): First Hispanic American male judge in Houston, Texas (1979)
Brian Middleton: First African American male to serve as the District Attorney for Fort Bend County, Texas (2018)
K.P. George: First Indian American male judge in Fort Bend County, Texas (2018)

Harris County 

Andrew L. Jefferson Jr. (1959): First African American to serve as a Judge of the 208th Criminal Court in Harris County, Texas (1974)
Steven Kirkland: First openly LGBT male to serve as a Harris County civil district judge (2008)
Jason Luong: First Asian American male (who is of Vietnamese descent) to serve as a district court judge in Harris County, Texas (2019)
Alfred J. Hernandez: First Hispanic American male judge in Harris County, Texas
Roland Garcia, Jr.: First minority male elected as the President of the Harris County Bar Association, Texas

Hays County 

Ruben Becerra: First Latino American male judge in Hays County, Texas (2019)

Jefferson County 

 Donald J. Floyd: First male judge (and African American) appointed to the Court at-law in Jefferson County, Texas
"Lupe" Flores: First Hispanic American male judge in Jefferson County, Texas

Lubbock County 

 Gregorio Coronado (1957): First Hispanic American male lawyer in Lubbock, Texas [Lubbock County, Texas]
 Sam Medina (1976): First Hispanic American male appointed as a Judge of County Court (1995) and serve as Presiding Judge of the 237th District Court (1998) Lubbock County, Texas

Nueces County 

 Carlos Valdez: First Hispanic American male to serve as the District Attorney of Nueces County, Texas (1992)

Potter County 

 Elisha Demerson: First African American male to serve as a county judge in Potter County, Texas (1986)

Smith County 

 Charles E. Coleman: First African American male lawyer in Tyler, Texas (1946) [Smith County, Texas]
 Andy Navarro: First Hispanic American male to serve as the President of the Smith County Bar Association, Texas

Tarrant County 

 Ollice Maloy, Jr.: First African American male to serve as the Assistant District Attorney of Tarrant County, Texas (1959)

Travis County 

 Alberto Garcia: First Latino American male judge in Travis County, Texas
George C. Thomas: First Indian American male judge in Travis County, Texas
Ramey Ko: First Asian American male judge in Austin County and Travis County, Texas (2010)
Nick Chu: First Asian American male to serve as the Justice of the Peace for Travis County, Texas (2017)

Victoria County 

 Manuel Velasco: First Mexican American male lawyer in Victoria, Victoria County, Texas
Juan Velasquez: First Hispanic American male judge in Victoria County, Texas (2008)

Waller County 

 Dewayne Charleston: First African American male judge in Waller County, Texas

Willacy County 

 Oscar Cavazos (c. 1951): First Hispanic American male lawyer in Willacy County, Texas

See also 

 List of first minority male lawyers and judges in the United States

Other topics of interest 

 List of first women lawyers and judges in the United States
 List of first women lawyers and judges in Texas

References 

 
Minority, Texas, first
Minority, Texas, first
first minority male lawyers and judges
Texas lawyers
Legal history of Texas